John Sackville (by 1523 – between 1547 and 1552) was an English politician.

He was a Member of Parliament (MP) for East Grinstead.

References

16th-century deaths
English MPs 1547–1552
Year of birth uncertain